Aadahl or Ådahl is a surname. Notable people with the surname include:

Bo Ådahl (1932–2000), Finnish diplomat
Erik Aadahl (born 1976), American sound editor
Simon and Frank Ådahl, members of the Swedish musical group Edin-Ådahl
Thorvald Aadahl (1882–1962), Norwegian newspaper editor, writer and playwright